Saurauia elegans is a species of plant in the family Actinidiaceae. It is native to The Philippines.  In The Philippines it is commonly called uyok and is used as a traditional medicine for lung ailments and also to decorate food dishes.

Description
It is a tree reaching 20 feet in height.  Its twigs are covered in rough hairs. Its leaves are 10.2 – 12.7 centimeters long, 2.7-3.4 cm wide at their base and come to a point at their tip.  Its petioles are 0.5 inches long.  Its flowers are axillary.  Its oval-shaped sepals are 3.4 millimeters long.  Its corolla are 6.8 millimeters long.  It has numerous stamens and 3 styles.  Its seeds are wrinkled and angular.

Reproductive biology
The pollen of S. elegans is shed as permanent tetrads.

References

elegans
Flora of the Philippines
Medicinal plants
Plants described in 1855
Taxa named by Celestino Fernández-Villar
Taxa named by Jacques Denys Choisy